JLEN Environmental Assets Group, formerly John Laing Environmental Fund, is a large British investment trust dedicated to investments in Renewable Energy Infrastructure. Established in 2014, the company is listed on the London Stock Exchange and is a constituent of the FTSE 250 Index. The chairman is Ed Warner.

References

External links
 Official site

Investment trusts of the United Kingdom
Financial services companies established in 2014